Chersotis ocellina is a moth of the family Noctuidae. It is found in the mountainous areas of Europe, especially in the Alps (on heights between 1,500 and 2,500 meters), the Apennine Mountains, Pyrenees and the Cantabrian mountains.

Description
R. ocellina Schiff. (— phyteuma Esp.) (Ilk). Forewing dark brown with more or less of a red tinge: veins pale to outer line; stigmata pale; the upper with dark centres; the orbicular small, round or oval, the reniform angled inwards along median vein to touch the orbicular; the cell black; hindwingbrown. A small species (wingspan is 25–28 mm.)  occurring on the Mountains of Europe, of Western Asia, and of North and Central Asia. — The form transiens Stgr. [now species Chersotis transiens Staudinger, 1896) from Central Asia only, is paler, and approaches Chersotis alpestris. Larva brown; dorsal line pale; lateral lines pale, inwardly brown-bordered, the whole dorsal field between them darker; spiracles brown, each with 2 pale-ringed black tubercles above them; head and anal plate brown ; thoracic plate black with 3 yellow streaks ; on various low plants.

Biology

The moth flies from July to August in one generation.

The larvae feed on various herbaceous plants.

Subspecies
There are two recognised subspecies:
Chersotis ocellina ocellina
Chersotis ocellina pyrenaellina (Pyrenees)

References

External links
www.lepiforum.de
www.nic.funet.fi
www.schmetterlinge-deutschlands.de
Fauna Europaea

Noctuinae
Moths of Europe